Airdmillan is a coastal locality in the Shire of Burdekin, Queensland, Australia.

Geography
The Coral Sea forms the eastern boundary, while Plantation Creek forms part of the southern. Kalamia Creek forms the northern boundary, and Mud Creek drains the land between.

History
The name Airdmillan comes from the name of a local sugar plantation. It is a coined word, combining the Gaelic word aird meaning high / lofty and Millan from the name of the plantation owner, Archibald Campbell MacMillan.

The Airdmillan State School opened on 30 January 1912; it closed on 12 December 1986.

References

Shire of Burdekin
Coastline of Queensland
Localities in Queensland